Fight Like a Girl is the only studio album by American country music duo Bomshel. It was released on October 20, 2009 via Curb Records. Its lead-off single, the title track, peaked at number 30 in June 2009, thus becoming the duo's first Top 30 country hit. "19 and Crazy" and "Just Fine" were released as the album's second and third singles, respectively; the former was another Top 40 hit with a peak of number 33, while the latter peaked at number 53.

History
Originally composed of Buffy Lawson and Kristy Osmunson, Bomshel first charted in 2006 with "It Was an Absolutely, Finger-Lickin', Grits and Chicken, Country Music Love Song." Neither this song nor the duo's next three singles — "Ain't My Day to Care," "Bomshel Stomp", or "The Power of One" — made top 40 on the country music charts. In addition, the duo did not have a full studio album release after its fourth single. Lawson subsequently left the duo in 2007, with Kelley Shepard taking her place. Shepard and Osmunson released "Just This Way" in 2008, followed by "Cheater, Cheater." While "Just This Way" never charted, "Cheater, Cheater" was a number 30 hit for Joey + Rory in early 2009.

In mid-2009, Bomshel entered the country Top 40 for the first time with "Fight Like a Girl", which the duo wrote with Bob Regan. This song peaked at number 30 approximately a month before the album's release, followed by "19 and Crazy", which became the duo's second Top 40 country hit. Also included on the album is a cover of No Doubt's "Just a Girl."

Critical reception
Thom Jurek of Allmusic gave the album two stars out of five, saying, "there are nine solidly written [songs], a good one, and a throwaway," but adding that he thought the production made it sound "more like it was recorded by machines than by people." Bobby Peacock of Roughstock gave it a positive review, calling it "brash and ballsy, anchored with well-chosen and often female-empowering themes" and saying that the lyrics use "cleverly-chosen details, unusual hooks and interesting turns of phrase."

Track listing

Personnel
Compiled from liner notes.
Bomshel
 Kristy Osmunson — background vocals, fiddle, mandolin, electric guitar, acoustic guitar, strings
 Kelley Shepard — lead vocals

Additional musicians
 Mike Brignardello — bass guitar
 Pat Buchanan — electric guitar
 Gary Burnette — acoustic guitar
 Chad Cromwell — drums
 Howard Duck — keyboards
 Shawn Fichter — drums
 Trey Hill — acoustic guitar
 Chuck Howard — electric guitar, percussion, programming
 Striker Howard — electric guitar
 Brent Mason — electric guitar
 Greg Morrow — drums
 Russ Pahl — electric guitar, banjo, Dobro, pedal steel guitar
 Brian Pruitt — drums
 Danny Rader — electric guitar, acoustic guitar
 Rich Redmond — drums
 Michael Rojas — keyboards
 Joe Schneider — bass guitar
 Paul Scholten — programming
 Adam Shoenfeld — electric guitar
 Michael Spriggs — acoustic guitar
 John Willis — electric guitar, acoustic guitar, banjo
 Glenn Worf — bass guitar
 Ronnie Yates — drums
 Craig Young — bass guitar
 Jonathan Yudkin — banjo, mandolin

 Personnel
 Chuck Howard — production (all tracks except "19 and Crazy"), engineering, overdubbing, mixing
 Mark Irwin — production ("19 and Crazy" only)
 "A.J." — overdubbing
 Josh Kear — production ("19 and Crazy" only)
 Kristy Osmunson — production ("19 and Crazy" only), engineering, overdubbing
 Craig White — engineering, overdubbing, mixing

Chart performance

References

2009 debut albums
Bomshel albums
Curb Records albums